Major General Abdul Wahab Wardak is from the Wardak Province of Afghanistan, and he is the Afghan Air Force Commander. He once served as a MIG-21 fighter jet pilot for the Afghan communist regime's military in the 1980s. He is an ethnic Pashtun.

References

External links 

Afghan military personnel
Living people
Year of birth missing (living people)
Place of birth missing (living people)
Afghan military officers